Mitchell William Evans (born 24 June 1994) is a New Zealand professional racing driver. He currently drives for the Jaguar TCS Racing team in Formula E. In 2012, he won the GP3 Series and he raced in the GP2 Series for four years, achieving 14th place in 2013, fourth in 2014, fifth in 2015, and 12th in 2016.

He previously won the 2010 and 2011 Toyota Racing Series in New Zealand and was runner up in the 2010 Australian Drivers' Championship despite missing three races. When he won the New Zealand Grand Prix in February 2011, it is believed he became the youngest driver to win an international Grand Prix at 16 years old.

He won his first Formula E race in the 2019 Rome ePrix.

Early career 
Born in Auckland, Evans was a champion karter in both restricted 100cc karts, and also won the CIK Trophy of New Zealand at JICA level. He moved to Formula First for the 2007 season, competing in three races of the Winter Series at Manfeild Autocourse, and ending the season eighteenth in the championship. He contested the full New Zealand championship in 2007–08, finishing ninth overall and recording a fastest lap.

Formula Ford 
He returned to Manfield for the 2008 Winter Series, but in Formula Ford, winning seven of 12 races he contested to take the championship. In his national Formula Ford campaign in 2008–09, Evans battled with Tauranga's Richie Stanaway who came out on top by just over 100 points. Evans won six races during the season, including doubles at Taupo and Manfield.

For 2009, Evans moved to the Australian Formula Ford Championship, and competed in the Victorian state championship. Evans was runner-up in the standings, losing out to CAMS Rising Star Luke Ellery in the state championship, and in the national championship to his team-mate at Sonic Motor Racing Services, Nick Percat. During the season, Evans became the youngest round winner in the championship's history, when he won at Sandown Raceway in August. As well as that win, he won five other races including a weekend sweep at Queensland Raceway, and a double win at Surfers Paradise.

Formula Three 

Evans was drafted in by Australian Formula 3 entrant Team BRM to compete for them at the final round of the season, at Sandown. BRM acquired Evans' services to help with Joey Foster's championship bid. Evans was quickly on the pace, setting the fastest time in the official practice session, and third in qualifying. In the first race, he ended up fourth overall and third in the Gold Star class, edging out Kristian Lindbom by just over a tenth of a second. However, in the second race, Evans led home his team-mate Foster to become the youngest winner of the Formula 3 Superprix, but Foster won the Australian Drivers' Championship.

For the 2010 season, Evans raced in New Zealand's Toyota Racing Series with the Giles Motorsport team. At the first round, Evans took pole position and won the race, a feat that had not been achieved since Brendon Hartley made his debut in the 2005 Toyota Racing Series. He added a second win at Timaru, and won the first contemporary formulae race at the new Hampton Downs Motorsport Park. He claimed the title at Taupo by three points, holding off New Zealander Earl Bamber who won all three races at the circuit.

Evans returned to Australian Formula 3 for the 2010 Australian Drivers' Championship, and won the first three races of the season at Wakefield Park. He skipped the second round at Symmons Plains to test a Formula Abarth car at Misano in Italy. But quickly resumed winning at Phillip Island.

GP3

2011 
Evans was signed to race in the 2011 GP3 Series in Europe by the MW Arden team which is co-owned by Christian Horner (principal of F1's Red Bull Racing), and Red Bull driver Mark Webber (Evans' manager). The series features identical new design Dallara-Renaults, and is considered to be the feeder to GP2 and then F1.

Evans won the feature race at Circuit de Catalunya in Spain, having finishing sixth and seventh in the first two races at the first round which was staged at Istanbul Park in Turkey . He then went into the Valencia Grand Prix in third place in the championship, and emerged leading the championship after a third in the feature and fourth in the sprint. He held a four-point lead over second placed Nigel Melker for the GP3 drivers' championship and MW Arden was leading the constructors championship too.

However, his performance dropped off for the rest of the season, and he only achieved another point scoring round when eighth in the feature race of the final round of the championship in Italy. He eventually finished ninth in the championship with 29 points.

2012 
Retained by MW Arden for the 2012 GP3 Season,
Evans began with a win in the feature race at the opening round of the championship in Spain. He also had wins at Valencia in Spain and on the Hockenheimring in Germany, and a second and two-thirds. He took his fourth pole position of the season at the final venue, Monza in Italy, but did not complete the feature race, requiring him to start from the back of the grid in race two. Evans worked his way through the field to seventh, but a puncture effectively ended his race, and the points for the fastest lap he recorded could not be claimed because he finished outside the top 10. Daniel Abt of Germany finished second in the race and was runner up to Evans in the championship by only two points.

Mark Webber told the media he was very proud of his protege, and he predicted Evans would move to GP2 in 2013. "There are a lot of good drivers in it (GP3),” he said, "yet it was Mitch who had the most poles and the most wins of anyone. He's learning all the time and I look forward to him moving up to another category next year and showing everyone what an exceptional talent he is."

GP2

2013 
Webber's prediction was correct because Evans moved up to GP2 with Arden as teammate to the very experienced Johnny Cecotto Jr. In the first racing weekend of the season, at Sepang in Malaysia where he had never raced before, Evans was suffering from food poisoning and had handling problems in the first race. But he finished third in the second race and at 18 years of age, and still a rookie, he became the youngest GP2 driver to stand on the podium.

2014 
For the 2014 season Evans moved to the Russian Time team alongside Artem Markelov. He took his maiden victory at Silverstone and then a second at Hockenheim, in what was GP2's 200th race. Four more podium appearances saw him finish fourth in the standings on 174 points, while Markelov placed 24th.

2015 
Evans remained with Russian Time for the 2015 season. Markelov was again his teammate. They placed 5th and 13th in the championship.

2016 
For the 2016 season Evans switched to Campos, alongside Sean Gelael. He took his first victory of the season in the Austrian feature race, leading a Campos 1–2 in changing conditions.

Formula E 

On 19 August 2016, it was announced that Evans would be one of four drivers testing with Jaguar at the pre-season test at Donington Park. Evans was later signed with the team.

Jaguar Racing (2016–)

2016-17 season 

During his first season, he partnered Adam Carroll, scoring 22 points to Carroll's 5. His best result of the season came in Mexico City, where he finished in fourth place, taking Jaguar's first points in Formula E. He set the fastest lap of the race in Berlin race 1, but didn't take the bonus point, because he retired from the race. Evans took further points-scoring finishes in Monaco, Paris & Montreal to finish the championship in 14th position.

2017–18 season 

For the 2017–18 season, he partnered Nelson Piquet Jr, who moved to Jaguar from NextEV. In the second race of the season in Hong Kong, Evans took his & Jaguar's first ever Formula E podium, finishing 3rd in after Daniel Abt's disqualification. In Santiago, Evans finished in 7th, behind teammate Piquet Jr, before coming in 6th in Mexico City. In Punta Del Este, Evans qualified in Superpole, but had his time disallowed for a technical infringement & had to start at the back of the grid. He fought his way superbly through the field to take 4th position. For much of the Rome ePrix, Evans was on target for a podium finish, battling with André Lotterer & Lucas di Grassi, but towards the closing stages, he ran out of usable energy & came home in 9th. Evans had a difficult race in Paris, finishing down in 15th position, but he bounced back in Berlin to finish 6th. Evans achieved a huge career milestone in Round 10 of the championship in Zurich, by taking his first ever Formula E pole position. However, he struggled in the race, losing the lead & then being hit by a drive-through penalty for overspeed under full course yellow conditions. He ultimately finished down in 7th. He retired from the first race in New York, but finished in 6th in race 2, to cement 7th in the championship, ahead of teammate Piquet Jr, 4 points ahead of Lotterer.

2018-19 season 

Evans was partnered by Nelson Piquet Jr for the second successive year. Evans' season got off to a promising start in Ad Diriyah, finishing in 4th position, whilst teammate Piquet Jr, scored his solitary point of the season in 10th. Evans scored points in all of the first 7 races, the only driver to do so. He finished 9th in Marrakesh & benefitted from a penalty given to Alexander Sims in Santiago, to finish 6th. This was followed by 7th in both Mexico City & Hong Kong. For the Rome ePrix, Evans got his Jaguar I-Type III, through to the Superpole shootout & qualified 2nd to Techeetah's André Lotterer. Lotterer held the lead at the start of the race, but a decisive move from Evans at the chicane, gave him the race lead. There was further drama, though. When Evans tried to take the Attack Mode for the second time, he didn't drive through all of the sensors & had to try & activate it the next lap. He also had to slow down during the closing stages, due to the pace during the rest of the race being faster than the Jaguar team had expected. Evans held on to the win, finishing ahead of Lotterer & Stoffel Vandoorne. Rome was also his first race with new teammate Alex Lynn. His first non-points result came in the wet Paris ePrix, where he finished down in 16th. He bounced back in Monaco, to finish 7th, which became 6th after the disqualification of Antonio Felix Da Costa. After a lacklustre Berlin weekend, Evans fought hard with Jean-Eric Vergne in the first ever Bern ePrix. Evans started on the front row & then attacked Vergne for the entire race, but due to the tight circuit & Vergne's defensive driving, Evans had to settle for second. For the first of the two New York City races, Evans qualified in 13th, knowing that his best chance to keep his title hopes alive would be to push through the field. He did just so, finishing less than a second behind race winner Sébastien Buemi in second place. This was enough to keep his title chances alive, with Vergne not scoring in the race. In the weekend's second qualifying session, Evans placed 8th & was set for points until a penultimate lap collision with Lucas di Grassi ended all hopes, although since Robin Frijns won the race he wouldn't have taken it anyway. He finished the season 5th overall with 105 points, helping Panasonic Jaguar take 7th in the constructor's standings.

2019-20 season 

Evans had a new teammate in James Calado for season 6 of Formula E. In the first race of the two Diriyah ePrix, Evans finished in 10th place and also scored the point for setting the fastest lap of the race of the runners in the top 10. In the second race of the weekend, he collided with Sam Bird, a clash which ended both their races. In the third round of the season, the 2020 Santiago ePrix, Evans set pole position & was set for a dominant victory, but a temperature issue meant he was passed by António Félix da Costa & Maximilian Günther finishing 4th on the road behind Nyck De Vries, but was promoted to 3rd after the Dutchman received a penalty. At the next race in Mexico City, he qualified second on the grid behind André Lotterer, but took the lead at the very start of the race & won the race with one of the biggest winning margins in the history of Formula E. A timing issue in Marrakesh meant that Evans was unable to set a qualifying time & started towards the back of the grid, but he put in a phenomenal recovery drive to finish 6th in the race.

In the 6 races in Berlin, Evans scored 15 points, with a fastest lap in race 3, finishing the season in 7th with 71 points.

2020-21 season 

Evans had a new teammate as Sam Bird made the move from Envision to Jaguar for the seventh season. The season started well with a podium finish in the opening race, however he was involved in a huge crash the following day which saw rival Alex Lynn vault over Evans' car & land upside down in the runoff area. Evans was quick to park his own car to rush to Lynn's aid. 

A solid points scoring weekend in Rome followed where Evans took a 3rd & 6th place finish, followed by a weak showing in Valencia which saw him score no points. Evans was on course to win the following Monaco ePrix until the last lap in which he was overtaken by António Félix Da Costa who had more usable energy & being passed on the line by Robin Frijns who finished second. 

Evans was on course for a podium finish in the second race in New York City, before hitting the wall & ending his chance of a points finish. A 3rd place finish came in the second London ePrix boosting his title aspirations. Evans would have 4 DNF's throughout the season, and 5 third places, with a fastest lap in the first Rome E-prix. Evans finished third in the penultimate race in Berlin, placing him 4th in the championship. In the final race of the season the next day, Evans started third and didn't move from the grid and was hit by Edoardo Mortara, eliminating him from the championship fight. Evans finished the season in 4th with 90 points, outscoring Bird by 3 points who finished 6th.

2021-22 season 

The season started poorly for Evans who was only able to accrue 1 point in the first 3 races. His took his first victory of the season in the first Rome ePrix, a highly-regarded drive which saw him charge through the field from 9th on the grid to 1st, taking his second victory of the weekend the following day. Evans took the third pole position of his Formula E career in Monaco, but was beaten by Stoffel Vandoorne to the race win. Evans took his third race win of the season in Jakarta, where he shadowed Jean-Éric Vergne for much of the race before making an overtake for the win. His only DNF of the season was during the second London EPrix. Mitch won the first race in Seoul, his 4th of the season. Evans finished the season in 2nd with 180 points, 33 behind Stoffel Vandoorne.

2022-23 season 
Evans will continue to drive for Jaguar Racing for 2022–23 season, alongside Sam Bird once again.

Personal life 
Evans attended Saint Kentigern College in Pakuranga, Auckland, but left at the end of 2010 to pursue his career overseas. Evans' career has been backed financially by entrepreneur Colin Giltrap, who helped establish careers for fellow New Zealand racing drivers Scott Dixon, Chris van der Drift and Brendon Hartley.

Racing record

Career summary 

* Season still in progress.

Complete GP3 Series results 
(key) (Races in bold indicate pole position) (Races in italics indicate fastest lap)

† Driver did not finish the race, but was classified as he completed over 90% of the race distance.

Complete GP2 Series results 
(key) (Races in bold indicate pole position) (Races in italics indicate fastest lap)

† Driver did not finish the race, but was classified as he completed over 90% of the race distance.

24 Hours of Le Mans results

Complete European Le Mans Series results

Complete Formula E results

References

External links 

 
 

1994 births
Living people
Sportspeople from Auckland
People educated at Saint Kentigern College
New Zealand racing drivers
Formula Ford drivers
24 Hours of Le Mans drivers
Australian Formula 3 Championship drivers
Toyota Racing Series drivers
British Formula Three Championship drivers
GP2 Series drivers
New Zealand GP3 Series drivers
GP3 Series Champions
V8SuperTourer drivers
Formula E drivers
Double R Racing drivers
Arden International drivers
Russian Time drivers
Jota Sport drivers
Campos Racing drivers
SMP Racing drivers
Jaguar Racing drivers
European Le Mans Series drivers
Virtuosi Racing drivers
ISport International drivers